Peter Fleming and John McEnroe were the defending champions, but McEnroe opted to focus on the singles tournament. Fleming teamed up with Tom Gullikson and lost in the quarterfinals to Stefan Edberg and Anders Järryd.

Ken Flach and Robert Seguso won the title by defeating Edberg and Järryd 7–5, 7–6 in the final.

Seeds

Draw

Finals

Top half

Bottom half

References

External links
 Official results archive (ATP)
 Official results archive (ITF)

1985 Grand Prix (tennis)